Yasser Mohamed Tahar Triki (born 24 March 1997) is an Algerian athlete competing in the long jump and triple jump. He won the silver medal in the long jump at the 2017 Summer Universiade. He also won multiple medals at regional level.

Triki has broken the Algerian record in triple jump several times and was the first Algerian to jump over 17 meters.

Triki broke the Algerian record in the triple jump with 17.31 meters achieved in Algiers meeting on 4 June 2021, thus qualifying to the 2020 Summer Olympics. In June 2021, he won the gold medals in both long jump and triple jump at the 2021 Arab Athletics Championships held in Tunis with jumps of 7.96 meters and 17.26 meters, respectively. On July 7, 2021, he improved his national record with a jump of 17.33 meters during the Gyulai István Memorial in Budapest

Triki also improved the Algerian indoor record in triple jump several times. He first broke the existing record held by Lotfi Khaida set in Indianapolis in March 1992 with 16.49 meters before Triki broke this on 25 January 2019 in Texas with a jump of 16.52. This record was improved on 11 February 2019 in Texas with 17.00 meters before a new record was set a few days later in Fayetteville (North Carolina) on 23 February 2019 with a mark of 17.12 meters.

International competitions

1Did not start in the final

Personal bests

Outdoor
Long jump – 8m08 (+0.2 m/s, Five Rings Sports Center, Wuhan (CHN) 2019)
Triple jump – 17m43 (+1.0 m/s, Tokyo Olympic Stadium, Tokyo (JPN, 5 August 2021, a national record) 
 Indoor
Long jump – 7.69 (College Station, Texas 2018)
Triple jump – 17.12 (Fayetteville, 23 February 2019, NR)

References

1997 births
Living people
Algerian male long jumpers
Algerian male triple jumpers
Athletes (track and field) at the 2014 Summer Youth Olympics
Universiade medalists in athletics (track and field)
Athletes (track and field) at the 2018 Mediterranean Games
Athletes (track and field) at the 2022 Mediterranean Games
Mediterranean Games silver medalists for Algeria
Texas A&M Aggies men's track and field athletes
Algerian expatriates in the United States
Mediterranean Games medalists in athletics
Universiade silver medalists for Algeria
Athletes (track and field) at the 2019 African Games
Medalists at the 2017 Summer Universiade
African Games competitors for Algeria
Athletes (track and field) at the 2020 Summer Olympics
African Games medalists in athletics (track and field)
African Games gold medalists for Algeria
African Games silver medalists for Algeria
Olympic athletes of Algeria
21st-century Algerian people